Volodymyr Doronin (born 15 January 1993 in Donetsk, Ukraine) is a Ukrainian footballer currently playing as a midfielder for Druzhba Myrivka.

He is a product of the FC Shakhtar Donetsk sportive school system, but then played for the Ukrainian First League club FC Olimpik Donetsk.

References

External links
 
 

1993 births
Living people
Ukrainian footballers
Association football midfielders
FC Shakhtar-3 Donetsk players
FC Olimpik Donetsk players
FC Arsenal Kyiv players
FC LNZ Cherkasy players
Footballers from Donetsk
Ukrainian Premier League players
Ukrainian First League players
Ukrainian Second League players